Donald Robert "Duffy" Dyer (born August 15, 1945) is an American former professional baseball player who is the manager of the Kenosha Kingfish of the Northwoods League collegiate summer baseball league. He played in Major League Baseball as a catcher for the New York Mets (1968–1974), Pittsburgh Pirates (1975–1978), Montreal Expos (1979), and Detroit Tigers (1980–1981).

Playing career
Dyer was born in Dayton, Ohio. He was a three-sport athlete at Cortez High School in Phoenix, Arizona, and played collegiately at Arizona State University. Dyer played alongside Sal Bando and Rick Monday as a member of the Arizona State Sun Devils baseball team that won the 1965 College World Series. 

He was drafted by the Mets in the 1966 Major League Baseball draft and backed up Jerry Grote as a member of the 1969 Miracle Mets team that went on to win the World Series. Dyer caught most of the Mets games in 1972, as Grote battled injuries. In 94 games, he posted career-highs with 8 home runs and 36 runs batted in. He also led National League catchers in double plays and in baserunners caught stealing, finished second in assists and, third in fielding percentage. In 1973, Dyer was part of the Mets team that staged another miraculous season when they came from last place on August 30 to win the National League Eastern Division pennant.

In October 1974, Dyer was traded to the Pirates for Gene Clines. He backed up Manny Sanguillén and helped the Pirates win the 1975 National League Eastern Division. Dyer was the Pirates catcher on August 9, 1976, when John Candelaria pitched a no hitter against the Los Angeles Dodgers. In 1977 the Pirates traded away Sanguillen, and Dyer shared catching duties with Ed Ott in a platoon system. Dyer led National League catchers in 1977 with a .996 fielding percentage, committing only two errors in 93 games.

Career statistics
In a fourteen-year major league career, Dyer played in 722 games and had 441 hits in 1,993 at bats for a .221 batting average, along with 151 runs, 74 doubles, 11 triples, 30 home runs, 173 runs batted in, 10 stolen bases, 228 walks, a .306 on-base percentage, a .315 slugging percentage, 627 total bases, 16 sacrifice bunts, 10 sacrifice flies and 49 intentional walks. In  he led National League catchers in range factor and baserunners caught stealing, and finished second in assists.

In 1986, Dyer was inducted into the Arizona State University Sports Hall of Fame.

Managing and coaching career
After his playing career, Dyer worked as a coach for the Chicago Cubs, the Milwaukee Brewers and the Oakland Athletics.

As a minor league manager, he led the Class-A Kenosha Twins to a Midwest League championship in 1985. In 1986 he managed the El Paso Diablos to a first-place finish in the Texas League.

On November 18, 2013, Dyer was announced as the inaugural manager for the Kenosha Kingfish of the Northwoods League collegiate summer baseball league. He managed the Kingfish for six years, compiling a record of 226 wins and 205 losses, and a league championship in 2015.

Popular culture
In the film "Into My Heart", Ben (Rob Morrow) refers to Duffy Dyer as "a cultural icon". Dyer's nickname came from the popular radio show Duffy's Tavern. His mother had been listening to the show when she went into labor, and asked "How's Duffy?" after giving birth.

References

External links

1945 births
Living people
American expatriate baseball players in Canada
Arizona State Sun Devils baseball players
Baseball coaches from Ohio
Baseball players from Dayton, Ohio
Chicago Cubs coaches
Detroit Tigers players
Greenville Mets players
Jacksonville Suns players
Major League Baseball catchers
Major League Baseball third base coaches
Milwaukee Brewers coaches
Minor league baseball managers
Montreal Expos players
New York Mets players
New York Mets scouts
Oakland Athletics coaches
Pittsburgh Pirates players
Tidewater Tides players
Williamsport Mets players
Florida Instructional League Mets players